Gia Carides (born 7 June 1964) is an Australian actress. She portrayed Liz Holt in Strictly Ballroom, Susy Connor in Brilliant Lies, and Cousin Nikki in My Big Fat Greek Wedding.

Early life
Carides was born in Sydney, Australia, to a Greek father and an English mother. Gia is sister to Zoe Carides, also an actress, and Danielle Carides, a singer songwriter. She began acting at the age of 12; her first film was the drama The Love Letters from Teralba Road.

Career
Early in her career, Carides starred as Helena Angelopolous on the Australian television series Police Rescue, also receiving acclaim for her films Strictly Ballroom and Brilliant Lies, with AFI Award nominations for each.

She is also known for her roles as Robin Swallows (née Spitz) in Austin Powers: The Spy Who Shagged Me and as Cousin Nikki in My Big Fat Greek Wedding, the sequel television show My Big Fat Greek Life, and the sequel film My Big Fat Greek Wedding 2.

Carides works in both America and Australia, recognised for a host of film and television credits including Primary Colors, Year One and East of Everything. She also appeared in a guest spot on husband Anthony LaPaglia's television series Without A Trace.

She has volunteered as an actress with the Young Storytellers Program.

Personal life
Carides was married to actor Anthony LaPaglia, whom she met in Sydney in 1992. A year later they starred together in the film Paperback Romance (a.k.a. Lucky Break). She and LaPaglia are the parents of daughter Bridget, born in January 2003.

In April 2015, newspapers reported that LaPaglia and Carides had split after 17 years.

Filmography

References

External links

Gia Carides– Australian Film Commission 
Mook-e Australian Actresses

1964 births
Actresses from Sydney
Australian film actresses
Australian television actresses
Australian people of English descent
Australian people of Greek descent
Living people
20th-century Australian actresses
21st-century Australian actresses
Association footballers' wives and girlfriends